Marcus Henderson may refer to:

 Marcus Henderson (musician) (born 1973), rock and heavy metal guitarist
 Marcus Henderson (actor), American actor
 Marcus Henderson, a character on the TV series Smart Guy